Agdistis takamukui is a moth of the family Pterophoridae. It is found on Kyushu island in Japan.

External links

Taxonomic and Biological Studies of Pterophoridae of Japan (Lepidoptera)
Japanese Moths

Agdistinae
Moths of Japan
Moths described in 1919